Radio Campus Paris is a student radio station in Paris. Created in 1998 as an internet radio station, it established a half-frequency on 93.9 FM in the Paris region in 2004 that it shares with Vivre FM, maintaining their online broadcast 24 hours a day. A member of the Radio Campus France network, the station prides itself on youth culture and eclecticism, hosting around 80 different programs in the 2017–18 season.

History
Radio Campus Paris was founded in 1998 with the aim of creating a new alternative media for all students in the Paris region.

The  assigned a half-frequency to Radio Campus Paris on the Parisian FM band on September 23, 2004, and since then, the station emits from 5:30 pm to 5:30 am on the 93.9 FM frequency in the Paris region.

Since June 2014 Radio Campus Paris also broadcasts on digital radio on multiplex 4 in Paris.

References

External links
Radio website

Campus, college, student and university radio stations
Radio stations in France
Radio in Paris
Radio stations established in 1998
1998 establishments in France